Liliana Fernández Steiner (born 4 January 1987) is a Spanish beach volleyball player. As of 2012, she plays with Elsa Baquerizo. The pair participated in the 2012 Summer Olympics tournament and were eliminated in the round of 16 by the Italians Greta Cicolari and Marta Menegatti.

Professional career

World tour 2016
The silver medal went to Elsa and Liliana at the Long Beach, California Grand Slam where they lost to April Ross/Kerri Walsh Jennings in straight sets of (21-16, 21-16)

Notes

References

External links

 
 
 
 
 
 

1987 births
Living people
Spanish beach volleyball players
Women's beach volleyball players
Beach volleyball players at the 2012 Summer Olympics
Beach volleyball players at the 2016 Summer Olympics
Olympic beach volleyball players of Spain
People from Benidorm
Sportspeople from the Province of Alicante
Beach volleyball players at the 2020 Summer Olympics